The Madrid–Barcelona high-speed rail line is a  standard gauge railway line inaugurated on 20 February 2008. In Barcelona the line is connected with the Perpignan–Barcelona high-speed rail line leading into France which connects it to the European high speed network.

Trains are operated by the national railway Renfe under the AVE and Avlo brands, and by private competitors Ouigo España and Iryo.

First stages 
In 2003 construction of the first phase of a new standard gauge line from Madrid to the French border (Madrid–Zaragoza–Lleida) was completed and on 11 October of that year commercial service began. This service also stopped at Guadalajara–Yebes and Calatayud. The service began running at only . On 19 May 2006, after two years of operation, speed was increased to  when the Spanish ASFA signalling system was replaced with level 1 of the new European ETCS/ERTMS system.

On 18 December 2006 the AVE started operating to Camp de Tarragona, and on 7 May 2007 the service increased its speed to the maximum allowable for the line, . This puts Tarragona at 30 minutes from Lleida. The extension to Barcelona was delayed various times due to technical problems; the Ministerio de Fomento having originally forecast the AVE's arrival in Barcelona by the end of 2007.

Complete operation 
The complete line was opened February 2008. As of 2012, seventeen trains now run every day between the hours of 6 am and 9 pm, covering the distance between the two cities in just 2 hours 30 minutes for the direct trains, and in 3 hours and 10 minutes for those calling at all intermediate stations. Before the high-speed line was built, the journey between the two cities took more than six hours.

Speed 
Nevertheless, in October 2011 the speed was raised to 310 km/h on parts of the railway.

Usage 
It was forecast that the AVE would substantially replace air traffic on the Barcelona – Madrid route (in the same way that the Eurostar has on the London-Paris/London-Brussels routes and France's TGV has on the Paris-Lyon route). Indeed, by the end of 2017, the line had already taken 63% of the traffic, taking most of it from aircraft. A few years before the Madrid-Barcelona route was the world's busiest passenger air route in 2007 with 971 scheduled flights per week (both directions). Similarly more than 80% of travellers between Madrid and Seville use the AVE, with fewer than 20% travelling by air.

Criticism 
There was criticism during the construction of the Madrid-Barcelona line. A critical report by the consulting firm KPMG, commissioned by ADIF (Administrador de Infraestructuras Ferroviarias) at the behest of the Ministry for Public Works on 23 June 2004, pointed to a lack of in-depth studies and over-hasty execution of works as the most important reasons for the problems that dogged construction of the AVE line. For example, during the construction of the AVE tunnel near Barcelona, a number of nearby buildings suffered damage from a sinkhole that appeared near a commuter rail station, damaging one of its platforms. The construction committee of Barcelona's famed Sagrada Familia church lobbied for a re-routing of the tunnel – it passes within metres of the massive church's foundations. It also passes equally near the UNESCO-recognized Casa Milà also designed by Antoni Gaudí.

Extension to France

Barcelona to Figueres 
Originally planned to open in 2009, the extension of some Madrid-Barcelona routes to Figueres–Vilafant railway station via Girona, opened on 7 January 2013. This made possible upon the completion of the  Barcelona-Figueres section of the Perpignan–Barcelona high-speed rail line that connected for the first time the Spanish AVE high-speed network with the French TGV high-speed network. There have been delays in building a four kilometre tunnel in Girona, the first phase of which was finished in September 2010, and controversy over the route between Sants and Sagrera stations in Barcelona.  there are eight trains a day running from Madrid, connecting at Figueres Vilafant with two TGV services to Paris.

Figueres to Perpignan 
This is an international high speed rail section between France and Spain. The section connects two cities on opposite sides of the border, Perpignan in Roussillon, France, and Figueres in Catalonia, Spain.  It consists of a  railway which crosses the French–Spanish border via the Perthus Tunnel, an  tunnel bored under the Perthus Pass. The section is open to high speed trains and freight. Construction was completed in February 2009, although services did not run until a station was built on the line at Figueres. As of March 2015, a daily TGV service connects Paris to Barcelona Sants via Perpignan-Figueres with 2 pairs of trips, plus other connections involving Lyon, Marseille, and Toulouse.

See also 

 LGV Méditerranée
 TER Languedoc-Roussillon
 List of highest railways in Europe

References

Notes

Further reading

External links 

 
Railway lines opened in 2008
Railway lines in Catalonia
Standard gauge railways in Spain
Transport in Alt Empordà
Rail transport in Barcelona
Transport in Figueres
Transport in Girona
Transport in Lleida
Rail transport in Madrid
Transport in Tarragonès
2008 establishments in Spain